Rick Wakeman's Greatest Hits  is an album by Rick Wakeman.

Despite what the title suggests, this is not a compilation album but instead one of re-makes of solo songs as well as covers of Yes. These are all instrumental versions and were only done with keyboards, guitar, bass and drums.

Most of the remakes of his solo work (11 out of 15) are from Journey to the Centre of the Earth.

Track listing

Disc 1 (Yes covers)
"Roundabout"
"Wonderous Stories"
"Don't Kill The Whale"
"Going For The One"
"Siberian Khatru"
"Madrigal"
"Starship Trooper"

Disc 2 (solo remakes)
"The Journey Overture"
"The Journey"
"The Hansbach"
"Lost In Time"
"The Recollection"
"Stream of Voices"
"The Battle"
"Liddenbrook"
"The Forest"
"Mount Etna"
"Journey's End"
"Sea Horses"
"Catherine of Aragon"
"Gone But Not Forgotten"
"Merlin The Magician"

Recording
Each disc was recorded in a different year. Disc 1 (Yes covers) was recorded from March–May 1993 while disc 2 was recorded from September–October 1992.

Personnel

 Rick Wakeman - keyboards
 Dave Winter - guitars
 Tony Fernandez - drums
 Alan Thompson - bass

Production

 Stuart Sawney - engineer, mixer
 Roger Dean - artwork

References

Rick Wakeman albums
1994 albums
Albums with cover art by Roger Dean (artist)